George H. Holland was an American lawyer who served as a state legislator and Auditor of Accounts (Treasurer) in Mississippi. A Republican, he served in the Mississippi House of Representatives.

He was the son of Charles Miller Holland Jr. He was a delegate at the 1868 Mississippi Constitutional Convention.

He was a Republican nominee for Mississippi State Treasurer on a ticket with Adelbert Ames, Alexander K. Davis, James Hill, William H. Gibbs, George E. Harris, and T. W. Cardozo. They were elected. He was succeeded by M. L. Holland.

References

Members of the Mississippi House of Representatives
19th-century American politicians
Year of birth missing
Year of death missing